Slane may refer to:

Places
Slane, a village in County Meath, Ireland
Slane Castle, located in Slane village
Hill of Slane, important historical site located in Slane village
Slane, County Antrim, a townland in County Antrim, Northern Ireland
Slanes, County Down, a parish and townland in County Down, Northern Ireland

People
Chris Slane, a New Zealand cartoonist
Dan Slane, an American businessman
 Paul Slane, Scottish footballer
Baron Slane, a Barony in the Peerage of Ireland 

Music
Slane Concert, a concert held in most years in Slane
Slane, an Irish folk tune to which a number of songs and hymns are sung, including "Be Thou My Vision"